The Elastic Four is a Barbershop quartet that won the 1942 SPEBSQSA international competition.

Main Article on Barbershop wiki:
Elastic Four

References
AIC entry (archived)

Barbershop quartets
Barbershop Harmony Society